Kuvandyk is a town in Orenburg Oblast, Russia, located on the Sakmara River at the southern end of the Ural Mountains,  east of Orenburg, the administrative center of the oblast. Population:

History
It was founded in the end of the 19th century as a migrants' village of Pokrovka. It was granted town status in 1953.

Administrative and municipal status
Within the framework of administrative divisions, Kuvandyk serves as the administrative center of Kuvandyksky District, even though it is not a part of it. As an administrative division, it is incorporated separately as the Town of Kuvandyk—an administrative unit with the status equal to that of the districts. As a municipal division, the territories of the Town of Kuvandyk and of Kuvandyksky District are incorporated as Kuvandyksky Urban Okrug.

References

Notes

Sources

External links
Official website of Kuvandyk 
Unofficial website of Kuvandyk 
History of Kuvandyk 
Mojgorod.ru. Entry on Kuvandyk 

Cities and towns in Orenburg Oblast
Monotowns in Russia